By-elections to the 19th Canadian Parliament were held to fill vacancies in the House of Commons of Canada between the 1940 federal election and the 1945 federal election. The Liberal Party of Canada led a majority government for the 19th Canadian Parliament.

Seventeen vacant seats were filled through by-elections.

See also
List of federal by-elections in Canada

Sources

 Parliament of Canada–Elected in By-Elections 

1945 elections in Canada
1943 elections in Canada
1942 elections in Canada
1941 elections in Canada
1940 elections in Canada
19th